The 2014–15 Big Bash League season or BBL|04 was the fourth season of the Big Bash League (BBL), the premier Twenty20 cricket competition in Australia. The fourth edition ran from 18 December 2014 to 28 January 2015. The league ran two weeks longer as compared to the previous season. The opening match of the 2014–15 Big Bash League was played between Adelaide Strikers and Melbourne Stars on 18 December at the Adelaide Oval. The format of fourth season is same as previous season. A total of 35 matches will be played during the Big Bash 2014–15 season.

The Perth Scorchers won back-to-back titles by defeating the Sydney Sixers by 4 wickets on the last ball of the match. The final was also the final match of Brett Lee's career. It was hosted at Canberra's Manuka Oval.

Jacques Kallis of the Sydney Thunder was named 'Player of the Tournament' for his 235 runs and 6 wickets in the tournament. Jason Behrendorff of the Scorchers was named 'Young Gun of the Tournament' for his 15 wickets in the season.

Points table

Squads

Regular season

Fixtures
There were 32 matches played during the group stage of the fourth edition of the Big Bash League. To address poor attendances and late finishing matches most matches started half an hour earlier, with matches in this time slot now 07:10pm AEDST. However, some matches including the final still started at 07:40pm AEDST.

Round 1

Round 2

Round 3

Round 4

Round 5

Round 6

Round 7

Round 8

Knockout phase

Semi finals
The top four teams from the group stage qualified for the semi finals.

Final
The winners of the 2 semi-finals qualified for the finals.

Statistics

Most runs

Most wickets

Source: BigBash

References

External links
Official fixtures
Big Bash League, 2014/15 on ESPN Cricinfo

Big Bash League seasons
Big Bash League
Big Bash League